A chinchilla is a fur-bearing mountain rodent native to South America.

Chinchilla may also refer to:

Fur
 Chinchilla rabbit, three breeds whose coat resembles that of chinchillas
 Chinchilla rat or chinchillones, of the family Abrocomidae
 A fur color determined by cat genetics

People
 Alfredo Chinchilla (born 1962), Costa Rica-born Norwegian judoka
 Carlos Samayoa Chinchilla (1898–1973), Guatemalan writer
 Édgar Chinchilla (born 1987), Guatemalan footballer
 Laura Chinchilla (born 1959), President of Costa Rica
 Marvin Chinchilla (born 1977), Costa Rican football player
 Maya Chinchilla, Guatemalan-American poet
 Óscar Chinchilla (born 1969), Guatemalan politician
 Pablo Chinchilla (born 1978), Costa Rican footballer

Places

Australia
 Chinchilla, Queensland, a town
 Chinchilla Airport
 Chinchilla Digger Statue, a heritage-listed memorial
 Chinchilla railway station
 Shire of Chinchilla, a former local government area

Spain
 Chinchilla de Montearagón, a municipality in Albacete, Castile-La Mancha, Spain
 Castle of Chinchilla
 Villar de Chinchilla, Albacete, Castile-La Mancha, Spain

United States
 Chinchilla, Pennsylvania

Other uses
 Chinchilla (band), a heavy metal band
 Chinchillas (lava dome), Chile and Argentina
 Chinchilla (cloth), a napped fabric
Chinchilla AI is a language model developed by DeepMind.

See also